Mary Lewis Nicotera is a retired American judoka. She won a bronze medal winner in the 48 kg. division at the 1980 World Judo Championships.  This was the first  women's judo world championship event.  She was one of the first American medal winners at a judo world championships.  At the U.S. national championships, she finished first 4 times, second 3 times, and third 2 times.

References

Year of birth missing (living people)
Living people
American female judoka
Pan American Games medalists in judo
Pan American Games gold medalists for the United States
Judoka at the 1983 Pan American Games
20th-century American women